General Sir Clive Gerard Liddell,   (1 May 1883 – 9 September 1956) was a senior British Army officer who served as Adjutant-General to the Forces from 1937 to 1939. He was Governor of Gibraltar from 1939 to 1941 during the early stages of the Second World War.

Military career
Liddell attended Uppingham School before enrolling at the Royal Military College, Sandhurst. He was commissioned into the British Army as a second lieutenant in the Leicestershire Regiment on 22 October 1902. He was an Adjutant from 1908 to 1911 and then became Staff Captain at 6th District of Northern Command in 1912. He served in the First World War as Assistant Adjutant & Quartermaster General at the War Office.

After the war he became an Instructor at the Staff College. He then went to the Imperial Defence College in 1927. He became a General Staff Officer at the War Office in 1928 and then Commander 8th Infantry Brigade in 1931. He became General Officer Commanding (GOC) 47th (2nd London) Division in January 1935 and then GOC 4th Division in November 1935 before becoming Adjutant-General to the Forces in 1937. He was appointed Governor and Commander-in-Chief of Gibraltar in 1939, a post he held until 1941. During his tenure of this post he organised the evacuation of all families of British service personnel and civilians from Gibraltar. He served as Inspector General for Training from 1941 to 1942; he retired in 1943.

He was also Colonel of the Royal Leicestershire Regiment from 1943 to 1948 and Governor of the Royal Hospital Chelsea from 1943 to 1949.

References

Bibliography

External links
British Army Officers 1939−1945
Generals of World War II

|-

|-
 

|-

|-

 

1883 births
1956 deaths
British Army generals
Academics of the Staff College, Camberley
People from Huddersfield
People educated at Uppingham School
Graduates of the Royal Military College, Sandhurst
British Army personnel of World War I
British Army generals of World War II
Knights Commander of the Order of the Bath
Companions of the Order of St Michael and St George
Commanders of the Order of the British Empire
Companions of the Distinguished Service Order
Governors of Gibraltar
Graduates of the Staff College, Camberley
Graduates of the Royal College of Defence Studies
Military personnel from Yorkshire
Royal Leicestershire Regiment officers